Semitrochatella is a genus of land snails with an operculum, terrestrial gastropod mollusks in the family Helicinidae.

Species 
Species within the genus Semitrochatella include:
 Semitrochatella alboviridis (Wright in Pfeiffer, 1864)
 Semitrochatella babei (Arango, 1876)
 Semitrochatella conica (Pfeiffer, 1839)
 Semitrochatella elongata (d’Orbigny, 1842)
 Semitrochatella fuscula (Gundlach in Pfeiffer, 1863)

References 

Helicinidae